Lake Morning is an ice lake, nearly  long, lying  north of Mount Morning along the east side of Koettlitz Glacier in Antarctica. It was mapped by the United States Geological Survey from ground surveys and Navy air photos, and was named in 1963 by the Advisory Committee on Antarctic Names in association with Mount Morning.

See also
Riu ō Te Ata Valley

References

Lakes of Victoria Land
Scott Coast